"Love @ 1st Sight" is a song by American recording artist Mary J. Blige, performed along with rapper Method Man. It was written by Blige, Sean Combs, Mario Winans, Stevie Jordan, Clifford Smith, and Mechalie Jamison and produced by Combs, Winans and Jordan for her sixth studio album, Love & Life (2003). The song is built around a sample of "Hot Sex" (1992) by American hip-hop trio A Tribe Called Quest. Due to the inclusion of the sample, several other writers are credited as songwriters. Lyrically, it features the protagonist persistently wondering about a romantic attraction for a stranger on the first sight.

The song was released as the album's lead single in the second quarter of 2003. A moderate commercial success, it reached number 22 on the US Billboard Hot 100 and number 10 on Hot R&B/Hip-Hop Singles & Tracks chart. In addition, the song charted within the top 20 in Italy and the United Kingdom, while reaching the majority on most other charts it appeared on. The radio edit of "Love @ 1st Sight" with intro was used for the accompanying music video, which was directed by Chris Robinson.

Music video
The single's music video was directed by Chris Robinson, who also directed Blige in a music video-styled Lady Foot Locker commercial in which "Love @ 1st Sight" is played in the background. Method Man appears in it, while Sean "Diddy" Combs makes a special cameo appearance. An iPod is featured prominently at the beginning of video, an instance of paid-for product placement on the part of Apple Inc.

Formats and track listings

Credits and personnel 
Credits adapted from the Love & Life liner notes.

 Mary J. Blige – songwriting, vocals
 Sean Combs – producer, mixing
 Patrick Dillett – recording
 Emery Dobyns  – mixing assistance
 Stevie J – producer
 Shannon Jones – background vocals
 Kandace Love – background vocals
 Lynn Montrose – mixing assistance
 Alexis Seton – recording assistance
 Franklin Socorro – recording
 Mario Winans – producer, instruments

Charts

Weekly charts

Year-end charts

See also
 Love at first sight

References

External links
 Official website

2003 singles
Mary J. Blige songs
Method Man songs
Music videos directed by Chris Robinson (director)
Songs written by Mary J. Blige
Songs written by Sean Combs
Songs written by Method Man
Songs written by Mario Winans
2003 songs
Geffen Records singles